The son calentano is an instrumental form of music from the Tierra Caliente region, Mexico. It has meters in 3/4 and 6/8, an ornamented use of violin and back beats on guitar and tamborita. It is usually played by conjunto calentano ensembles and is traditionally performed with dancers.

References

Regional styles of Mexican music
Mexican styles of music